Oleh Mykhailovych Bobalo (January 19, 1978 – December 20, 2022) was a Ukrainian director and soldier in the Armed Forces of Ukraine.

Personal life 
He was born on 19 January 1978 in Lviv in what was, at the time, the Ukrainian Soviet Socialist Republic, USSR. In 2022, Oleh joined the Armed Forces of Ukraine to fight against the Russian Invasion of Ukraine. He was subsequently killed on the battlefields of Bakhmut, Donetsk Oblast, on 20 December 2022.

Directorial work 
He is most known for his work on his short film titled "The structure of coffee, or yabzats", however, he is also known for directing films such as "Другий фронт" (The Second Front) and "Диверсанты" (Saboteurs).

References 

People from Lviv
Ukrainian film directors
1978 births
2022 deaths